opened in the precincts of Kumamoto Castle, Kumamoto, Japan in 1976. It is one of Japan's many museums which are supported by a prefecture.

The permanent collection focuses on the art and crafts of Kumamoto Prefecture and also contains works by Renoir and Rodin. One room is dedicated to replicas of decorated kofun found in the prefecture.

See also
 Kumamoto Prefectural Ancient Burial Mound Museum
 Prefectural museum

References

External links
  Kumamoto Prefectural Museum of Art
  Kumamoto Prefectural Museum of Art

Art museums and galleries in Japan
Prefectural museums
Museums in Kumamoto Prefecture
Kofun
Kunio Maekawa buildings
Art museums established in 1976
1976 establishments in Japan